Damian Callinan is an actor/comedian from Melbourne, Australia.

Entertainment career
Callinan has performed in many mediums, including TV, film, radio and live stand-up. He came to national prominence in 2003 as an actor in the Australian sketch comedy television series skitHOUSE as well as making regular appearances on Before the Game.

In 2006, Callinan presented a live comedy show as part of the Melbourne Comedy Festival about his fertility problems entitled Damian Callinan has Spaznuts. That year he also debuted Babysitting, casting himself as a babysitter caring for a giant baby. In his show Sportsman's Night, Callinan, with no props, performed every role in a story about a football club gathering.  He's also performed several other solo comedy shows: Damian Callinan Calls "Last Drinks", Eureka Stocktake, The Cave To The Rave: The Story of Dance and Speech Night.

In 2007, he appeared in a stage show called The Complete Works of William Shakespeare Abridged alongside Frank Woodley and Keith Adams.

In 2008, he played Pete Minotti in the City Homicides "Somersaulting Dogs".

Callinan appeared in the 2013 film Backyard Ashes, directed by Mark Grentell.

Callinan's show The Merger was commissioned by Regional Arts Victoria and Vic Health to deal with issues of racism in regional communities. Callinan began performing the show in 2010. The show tells the story of a struggling country football club that recruits newly arrived refugees to fill its playing roster. In 2015, Callinan began writing a screenplay adaption of The Merger, funded by two grants from Screen NSW.

In March 2015, Callinan took his show The Lost WWI Diary to the Adelaide Fringe Festival. The show, a black humour comedy based on a diary discovered in a Warrnambool op-shop, featured characterisations of ANZAC soldiers at the time of the Gallipoli Campaign. A Fairfax Media reviewer who saw the show in Sydney in 2014, Craig Platt, noted the show managed to be both irreverent and reverent, but suggested it could have taken more risks to bring something new to the Gallipoli story. News Corp Australia reviewer Nick Richardson was impressed by the show's realism.

Callinan launched his twelfth solo show, Swing Man at the Melbourne International Comedy Festival in 2016. A Herald Sun reviewer who saw the show in March 2016, James Wigney, wrote that the show was an affectionate insight into Callinan's Catholic country childhood and the world of swing dance.

In 2017, the one-man stage show titled The Merger received funding from Screen NSW, and Backyard Ashes director Mark Grentell reteamed with Callinan to helm the film version (also called The Merger), which was released nationally around Australia in 2018 and became available on Netflix near the end of 2020.

Filmography
 skitHOUSE
 Comedy Slapdown
 Before The Game
 The Wedge
 Rove Live
 Melbourne Comedy Festival Gala
 Joker Poker
 Good Morning Australia
 The Fat
 Off Road
 Backyard Ashes 
 The Merger
City Homicide (2008)

References

External links

 Official website

Living people
Comedians from Melbourne
RMIT University alumni
Australian male comedians
Year of birth missing (living people)